= Deafness in Algeria =

Located in North Africa Algeria is one of the largest countries in the continent; it is the tenth largest nation globally with a population estimate of about 48.2 million citizens. Algeria holds a land of vast cultures such as Arab-Islamic heritage, Amazigh indigenous roots, French colonialism, Ottoman influence and more. This introduces a multitude of language and traditions like Arabic and Algerian Amazigh.

The diversity presented in Algeria brings forth multiple religions and communities like the Deaf and Hard of Hearing community (DHH). The DHH population in Algeria is estimated to be about 488,000. The DHH community in Algeria relies heavily on Algerian sign language locally known as Langue des signes algérienne (LSA) and mainly referred to as Ghardaia Sign Language. Shared DHH signing communities rely on Algerian Jewish Sign Language (AJSL). These factors have led to the near extinction of Algerian Jewish Sign Language with an EGIDS level of 8b. On the other hand, Algerian sign language is growing through culture and being shared with the deaf community in Algeria with a 6a EGIDS level. AJSL is not being taught to the youth; older generations are usually residing within these shared spaces and is no longer being taught to the younger generations. The estimation of AJSL signers is no more than a few hundred out of thousands of DHH people in Algeria.

The Universal Newborn hearing Screening (UNHS) is a test given to newborns to check for hearing loss. The entirety of Africa does not offer this test for newborns apart from Nigeria and South Africa. 0-1% of screening has happened in Africa, with only a study that proves it's possible to become a program in Algeria. In the study 1,915 newborns were proven to need a follow-up after failing the DPOE out of the 15,382 babies screened in Algeria. In the second term, 399 newborn babies were lost to follow-up out of the 1,516 newborns that returned. The study highlights how 3 out of 1000 babies in Algeria are born with permanent childhood hearing loss. This screening happened in 2018 there is no new evidence or indication that these findings are still factual due to the little to none screenings happening in Algeria.

Algeria signed the CRPD in 2007 on March 30th pushing for equality and fairness for everyone including those with a disability, This law is still intact today, many DHH persons deal with issues such as getting jobs, communicating with hearing people and gaining simple respect in their spaces. Recently there has been an increase in hiring DHH Algerians due to the push of the Algerian government. Younger generations in Algeria are showing positivity and acceptance more than the prior older generations. Therefore helping Algeria become a more accepting inclusive country for those with a disability as more people come together plus funding from the government DHH people are able to live freely without prejudice. There is still much more work to be done but it is improving slowly, but surely.

In Algeria citizens have access to free healthcare and private healthcare is also an option if you're able to afford the services. The free healthcare offered in Algeria can be taxing and hard for DHH people making it hard for them to receive aid and help. There are very few health professionals that understand or have access to the technology needed to assist DHH persons. This affects the mental health and courage of the deaf people in Algeria, they feel unheard in these clinical environments due to continuously being unheard and misdiagnosed. There are a lot of tech advancements happening in Algeria including being able to communicate with deaf patients. The problem is that healthcare staff aren't sure how to use these devices or how to understand DHH citizens. These visits can be exhausting especially with how long the wait is to get professional help because of the free healthcare.
